Philippe Sudré Dartiguenave (6 April 1863 – 26 July 1926) was a Haitian political figure. He served as president of Haiti from 12 August 1915 to 15 May 1922, during the U.S. military occupation that had begun on 27 July 1915. 

U.S. Admiral William B. Caperton was the commander of the American occupation troops in Haiti after the assassination of President Jean Vilbrun Guillaume Sam. Civil order in Haiti had completely broken down and Caperton was ordered by Washington DC to find a suitable candidate for the presidency. Two names emerged, Rosalvo Bobo, who was the leader of an ongoing rebellion against the Guillaume Sam government, and Dartiguenave, then president of the Haitian Senate. After interviewing both men Caperton formed the opinion that Bobo was mentally unstable and unfit for any office.  He informed Washington of this and was told by assistant secretary of the Navy, Franklin D Roosevelt that "the election of Dartiguenave is preferred by the United States".. Dartiguenave won the election in the Haitian Senate by a vote of 94 to 3 and was inaugurated on 12 August 1915.

Biography
Dartiguenave was a mulatto, born on 6 April 1863. Dartiguenave served as the President of the Senate of Haiti in 1910s. He served as President of Haïti from 12 August 1915 to 15 May 1922 in a government set up by the United States after its military occupation began on 27 July 1915 following an uprising which resulted in the death of President Vilbrun Guillaume Sam. He died on 26 July 1926.

References

1863 births
1926 deaths
Haitian people of Mulatto descent
Presidents of Haiti
People from Nippes
Presidents of the Senate (Haiti)
Presidents of the Chamber of Deputies (Haiti)
People of the Banana Wars